Jilly Johnson ( Gosden; 17 November 1953) is a British former model, actress and Page 3 girl.

Biography 
Johnson was born Jilly Gosden on 17 November 1953 in  Australia. Her family moved back to Surrey, England when she was eight, and she attended Horsell Primary School and Sheerwater Secondary School in Woking, Surrey.

In the 1970s and 1980s together with Nina Carter, she was in the girl group Blonde on Blonde. Johnson was also featured on the album cover for the album Moontan by Dutch hard rock band Golden Earring in 1973.

In 1975, she became the first model to appear topless in the Daily Mirror

She has written two novels: Double Exposure (1994) and Playing for Love (1997).

She has been married twice and has one daughter from her first marriage. Johnson is now a housewife and grandmother. She is also noted for her love of Great Danes.

Filmography

Film

Television

Published books
 Playing for Love, published by Simon & Schuster (1997)
 Double Exposure, published by Smith Gryphon (1994)

References

External links
 

1953 births
British women singers
Living people
Page 3 girls
People from Woking